Marc Julia  (23 October 1922 – 29 June 2010) was a French chemist and the winner of the 1990 CNRS Gold Medal in chemistry.  He discovered the Julia olefination  reaction in 1973.

Biography
Julia was born in 1922 in Paris as son of the renowned mathematician Gaston Julia. Julia studied physics at the École Normale Supérieure. After receiving his diploma he joined the group of Ian Heilbron and David G. Jones at the Imperial College London where he received his first PhD in 1948.

References

Further reading

1922 births
2010 deaths
20th-century French chemists
Members of the French Academy of Sciences
Organic chemists
French expatriates in the United Kingdom